The traditional Chinese lunisolar calendar divides a year into 24 solar terms. Xiàzhì is the 10th solar term, and marks the summer solstice. It begins when the Sun reaches the celestial longitude of 90° and ends when it reaches the longitude of 105°. It more often refers in particular to the day when the Sun is exactly at the celestial longitude of 90°.

Date and time

Western correlation
In the Gregorian calendar, it usually begins around 21 June and ends around 7 July.

The solstices
The solstices (as well as the equinoxes) mark the middle of the seasons in traditional East Asian calendars. Here, the Chinese character 至 means "extreme", which implies "solstices", so the term for the summer solstice directly signifies the summit of summer.

See also
Midsummer
Solstice

References

10
Summer